Fritz Thiele (14 April 1894 – 4 September 1944) was a member of the German resistance who also served as the communications chief of the German Army during World War II.

Thiele was born in Berlin and joined the Imperial Army in 1914. Working closely with Chief of army communications General der Nachrichtentruppe Erich Fellgiebel, he was part of the assassination attempt against Adolf Hitler on 20 July 1944. He was responsible as part of the coup attempt in the effort to sever communications between officers loyal to Hitler and armed forces units in the field and from the communications centre at the Bendlerstrasse in Berlin; he relayed a crucial message from Fellgiebel to General Friedrich Olbricht and the other conspirators that the assassination attempt had failed but the coup attempt should still proceed. There are differing accounts of the time when he provided this report.

Thiele himself did not want to proceed with the coup attempt when he knew that the assassination attempt had failed and he left the Bendlerstrasse and visited Walter Schellenberg at the Reich Central Security Office in an attempt to extricate himself.

Following Fellgiebel's arrest he was directed to assume his duties before he was himself arrested by the Gestapo on 11 August 1944. He was condemned to death on 21 August 1944 by the Volksgerichtshof and hanged on 4 September 1944 at Plötzensee prison in Berlin.

See also
Lucy spy ring

Sources
 Plötzensee Prison

References 

Executed members of the 20 July plot
People from Berlin executed at Plötzensee Prison
German Army generals of World War II
People condemned by Nazi courts
Executed people from Berlin
History of telecommunications in Germany
Telecommunications in World War II
1894 births
1944 deaths
People executed by hanging at Plötzensee Prison
Lieutenant generals of the German Army (Wehrmacht)